Warren Township is one of the sixteen townships of Belmont County, Ohio, United States. The 2010 census found 5,974 people in the township, 1,781 of whom lived in the unincorporated portions of the township.

Geography
Located in the western part of the county, it borders the following townships:
Kirkwood Township - north
Goshen Township - east
Wayne Township - southeast corner
Somerset Township - south
Millwood Township, Guernsey County - west
Oxford Township, Guernsey County - northwest

The village of Barnesville is located in central Warren Township.

Name and history
Warren Township was organized about 1806–1807.

It is one of five Warren Townships statewide.

In 1833, several gristmills and saw mills were being operating in Warren Township, powered by the waters of Captina Creek and the Stillwater River.

Government
The township is governed by a three-member board of trustees, who are elected in November of odd-numbered years to a four-year term beginning on the following January 1. Two are elected in the year after the presidential election and one is elected in the year before it. There is also an elected township fiscal officer, who serves a four-year term beginning on April 1 of the year after the election, which is held in November of the year before the presidential election. Vacancies in the fiscal officership or on the board of trustees are filled by the remaining trustees.

The township's trustees meet in Barnesville.

References

External links
County website

Townships in Belmont County, Ohio
Townships in Ohio
1806 establishments in Ohio